Ibrahim Abdelhamid Abdou (born 20 December 1905, date of death unknown) was an Egyptian football defender who played for Egypt in the 1934 FIFA World Cup. He also played for El-Olympi, and was part of Egypt's squad at the 1936 Summer Olympics, but he did not play in any matches.

References

Egyptian footballers
Egypt international footballers
Association football defenders
Olympic Club (Egypt) players
1934 FIFA World Cup players
1905 births

Year of death missing
20th-century Egyptian people